Mark Christopher Blake (born 17 December 1967) is an English retired footballer, who played as a defender for Southampton, Colchester United, Shrewsbury Town, Fulham, AS Cannes and Aldershot Town. He made 301 appearances in The Football League, scoring 23 goals.

Playing career
Blake started his career with Southampton, where he made 18 appearances in The Football League, scoring twice. He was loaned out to Colchester United in 1989. He then moved on to Shrewsbury Town in 1990, where he made 142 league appearances scoring three goals, during a four-year period. Blake then joined Fulham where he played 137 league appearances and scored 17 goals. He then moved on to AS Cannes and Aldershot Town.

Non-playing career
He went on to become player-manager of Winchester City, winning the FA Vase, Wessex League and Wessex League Cup treble in 2003–04. Blake then had a role as head coach at Eastleigh, joining in January 2005, before stepping down in September 2006.

Personal life
Blake was born in Portsmouth, Hampshire, and has a job in IT.

He has two children with his first marriage.

Honours

Club
Fulham
 Football League Third Division runner-up: 1996–97

Winchester City
 FA Vase winner: 2003–04

References

External links

Mark Blake at Coludata.co.uk

1967 births
Living people
English footballers
English Football League players
Ligue 2 players
Southampton F.C. players
Colchester United F.C. players
Shrewsbury Town F.C. players
Fulham F.C. players
AS Cannes players
Aldershot Town F.C. players
Winchester City F.C. players
Footballers from Portsmouth
Association football defenders